Hahn is an unincorporated community in the part of Wayne Township in Bollinger County, Missouri, United States. The community was established in 1895 and was named for Daniel Hahn, who settled in 1805 on the creek which also bears his name. The Hahns were one of the early families who settled in the area. A post office was in operation between 1895–1954.

References 

Unincorporated communities in Bollinger County, Missouri
Cape Girardeau–Jackson metropolitan area
Unincorporated communities in Missouri
1895 establishments in Missouri